Ahn Ji-man (Hangul: 안지만, Hanja: 安志晚; born October 1, 1983) is a South Korean relief pitcher who played for the Samsung Lions of the KBO League.

Professional career 
Ahn was selected by the Samsung Lions in the 2nd round (5th pick, 20th overall) of the 2002 KBO Draft.

During his career, he was one of the best relief pitcher in the Korean baseball league.
but because of his opening illegal sports betting website, he was released in 2016.

Statistics

External links 
 Profile and stats on the KBO official site

1983 births
Asian Games gold medalists for South Korea
Asian Games medalists in baseball
Baseball players at the 2010 Asian Games
Baseball players at the 2014 Asian Games
KBO League pitchers
Living people
Medalists at the 2010 Asian Games
Medalists at the 2014 Asian Games
Samsung Lions players
South Korean baseball players
Sportspeople from Daegu